Lautenburg may refer to:

 Female and male subcamps of the Stutthof concentration camp
 The German name of Lidzbark Welski, a city in northern Poland